David Henry Auston (born 1940) is a Canadian-American physicist, known for his work on terahertz technology, and in particular, the development of the Auston switch.

Auston was born in Toronto, Ontario, Canada in 1940, and completed his B.A.Sc. and M.A. degrees in Engineering Physics and Electrical Engineering respectively, from the University of Toronto. He then moved to California to work at the General Motors Defense Laboratory, and completed his PhD in Electrical Engineering from the University of California, Berkeley in 1969, working in the then-new area of laser physics. He was then offered a job at the AT&T Bell Labs with an open research mandate. Once there, he collaborated with materials scientist Alastair M. Glass to study properties of electro-optic crystals. Shortly after, he came up with the idea of using photoconducting antennae as both a source and detector of radiation, developing what came to be known as "Auston switches".

After the downsizing of Bell Labs in 1987, Auston moved to Columbia University as Professor of Electrical Engineering and Applied Physics, then moving to Rice University as Provost in 1994, until being appointed President at Case Western Reserve University in 1999. In 2003, he moved back to Santa Barbara, California to serve as the President of the Kavli Foundation.

Auston was elected a member of the National Academy of Engineering in 1989 for pioneering development in the field of picosecond and femtosecond optoelectronics.

References

Living people
1940 births
People from Toronto
University of Toronto alumni
UC Berkeley College of Engineering alumni
Columbia University faculty
Rice University faculty
Case Western Reserve University faculty
Members of the United States National Academy of Sciences
Members of the United States National Academy of Engineering
Fellows of the American Academy of Arts and Sciences
Presidents of Case Western Reserve University
Canadian emigrants to the United States
Fellows of the American Physical Society